Pallabi metro station (romanised: Pollobee metro steshen) is a metro station of the Dhaka Metro's MRT Line 6. This station is located at Pallabi, Dhaka. The station was opened on 25 January 2023.

Station

Station layout

References

Dhaka Metro stations
Railway stations opened in 2023
2023 establishments in Bangladesh